Bryochoerus is a genus of tardigrades in the family Echiniscidae.

Species
This genus includes only two species:
 Bryochoerus intermedius (Murray, 1910)
 Bryochoerus liupanensis Xue, Li, Wang, Xian & Chen, 2017

References

Further reading
 Nomenclator Zoologicus info

Echiniscidae
Tardigrade genera